The Dunedin local elections, 2010 were part of the 2010 New Zealand local elections, to elect members to sub-national councils and boards. The Dunedin elections are used to elect the Mayor of Dunedin and to elect councilors to the Dunedin City Council.

As per the Local Electoral Act 2001, all the elections occurred on Saturday 9 October 2010. Voting was carried out by postal ballot, using the single transferable vote system.

Mayor

The candidates for mayor included Peter Chin, the incumbent who was running for a third consecutive term. His contenders included Dave Cull and Lee Vandervis.

Councillors
In 2010 the ward system was changed with there now being just three wards in Dunedin. The Central Ward which would elect eleven councilors, Mosgiel Taieri Ward which would elect two and the Waikouaiti Coast-Chalmers Ward which would elect one.

Central ward
All eleven incumbent councillors sought re-election, while 28 other people sought election to the council.

Eight of the eleven councillors returned to the council as councillors, while councillor Dave Cull returned as mayor. Three new councillors were elected: Richard Thomson, Lee Vandervis, and Jinty MacTavish.

a Dave Cull was already elected mayor, so his votes were immediately transferred to the elector's next preference.
Source:

Mosgiel Taieri Ward

Source:

Waikouaiti Coast-Chalmers Ward

Source:

References

Dunedin
Politics of Dunedin
Dunedin
2010s in Dunedin